Album-oriented rock (AOR, originally called album-oriented radio) is an FM radio format created in the United States in the 1970s that focuses on the full repertoire of rock albums and is currently associated with classic rock.

Album-oriented radio was originally established by U.S. radio stations dedicated to playing album tracks by rock artists from the hard rock and progressive rock genres. In the mid-1970s, AOR was characterized by a layered, mellifluous sound and sophisticated production with considerable dependence on melodic hooks. Using research and formal programming to create an album rock format with greater commercial appeal, the AOR format achieved tremendous popularity in the late 1970s and early 1980s.

From the early 1980s onward, the "album-oriented radio" term became normally used as the abbreviation of "album-oriented rock," meaning radio stations specialized in classic rock recorded during the late 1960s and 1970s. 

The term is also commonly conflated with "adult-oriented rock", a radio format that also uses the initialism "AOR" and covers not only album-oriented rock but also album tracks and "deep cuts" from a range of other rock genres, such as soft rock and pop rock.

History

Freeform and progressive
The album-oriented rock radio format started with programming concepts rooted in 1960s idealism. The freeform and progressive formats developed the repertoire and set the tone that would dominate AOR playlists for much of its heyday.

In July 1964, the U.S. Federal Communications Commission (FCC) adopted a non-duplication rule prohibiting FM radio stations from merely running a simulcast of the programming from their AM counterparts. Owners of AM/FM affiliate stations fought these new regulations vigorously, delaying the enactment of the new rules until January 1, 1967. When finally enacted, station owners were pressed to come up with alternative programming options.

The freeform format in commercial radio was born out of the desire to program the FM airwaves inexpensively. Programmers like Tom Donahue at KMPX in San Francisco developed stations where DJs had the freedom to play long sets of music, often covering a variety of genres. Songs were not limited to hits or singles; DJs often played obscure or longer tracks by newer or more adventurous artists rather than those heard on Top 40 stations of the day. This reflected the growth of albums as opposed to singles as rock's main artistic vehicle for expression in the 1960s and 1970s.

With a few exceptions, commercial freeform had a relatively brief life. With more and more listeners acquiring FM radios, the stakes became higher for stations to attract market share so that they could sell more advertising at a higher rate.

By 1970, many of the stations were moving to institute programming rules with a "clock" and system of "rotation." With this shift, stations' formats in the early 1970s were now billed as progressive. DJs still had much input over the music they played, and the selection was deep and eclectic, ranging from folk to hard rock with other styles such as jazz fusion occasionally thrown in.

1970s
In October 1971, WPLJ in New York began to shift its freeform progressive rock format into a tighter, hit-oriented rock format similar to what would later become known as AOR. WPLJ's parent company, ABC, installed similar formats on all of its FM stations, including KLOS in Los Angeles and WRIF in Detroit. In 1973, Lee Abrams, formerly at WRIF, successfully installed a similar format, later known as SuperStars, at WQDR in Raleigh, North Carolina.

In 1972, Ron Jacobs, program director at KGB-FM in San Diego, began using detailed listener research and expanded playlists in shifting the Top 40 station toward a progressive rock format. Meanwhile, at competing station KPRI, program director Mike Harrison was similarly applying Top 40 concepts to the progressive format, which he dubbed "album-oriented rock."

In the mid-1970s, as program directors began to put more controls over what songs were played on air, progressive stations evolved into the album-oriented rock format. Stations still played longer songs and deep album tracks (rather than just singles), but program directors and consultants took on a greater role in song selection, generally limiting airplay to just a few "focus tracks" from a particular album and concentrating on artists with a more "commercial" sound than what had been featured a few years earlier. Noted DJ "Kid Leo" Travagliante of the station WMMS in Cleveland observed the changes in a 1975 interview: "I think the '60s are ending about now. Now we are really starting the '70s. The emphasis is shifting back to entertainment instead of being 'relevant' ... In fact, I wouldn't call our station progressive radio. That's outdated. I call it radio. But I heard a good word in the trades, AOR. That's Album-Oriented Rock. That's a name for the '70s."

Radio consultants Kent Burkhart and Lee Abrams had a significant impact on AOR programming. Beginning in the mid-1970s, they began contracting with what would become over 100 stations by the 1980s. Abrams' SuperStars format, previously developed at WQDR, was based on extensive research, focused on the most popular artists such as Fleetwood Mac and the Eagles, and also included older material from those artists. While his format was not quite as constricted as Top 40 radio, it was considerably more restricted than freeform or progressive radio. Their firm advised program directors for a substantial segment of AOR stations all over the U.S.

By the late 1970s, AOR radio stations discarded the wide range of genres embraced earlier on to focus on a more narrowly defined rock sound. The occasional folk, jazz, and blues selections became rarer, and most Black artists were effectively eliminated from airplay. Whereas earlier soul, funk, and R&B artists like Stevie Wonder, War, Sly Stone, and others had been championed by the format, AOR was no longer representing these styles and took a stance against disco. In 1979, Steve Dahl of WLUP in Chicago destroyed disco records on his radio show, culminating in the notorious Disco Demolition Night at Comiskey Park.

What links the freeform, progressive, and AOR formats is the continuity of rock artists and songs carried through each phase. Programmers and DJs of the freeform and progressive phases continued to cultivate a repertoire of rock music and style of delivery that became the foundations of AOR and classic rock radio. Those AOR stations, which decided to stay demographically rooted, became classic rock stations by eschewing newer bands and styles for which their older listeners might have tuned out. Those that did not fully evolve into classic rock stations generally attempted to keep their older listeners through careful dayparting – playing large amounts of classic rock during the workday, while newer material was played at night when the listener base skewed younger.

Programming
Most radio formats are based on a select, tight rotation of hit singles. The best example is Top 40, though other formats, like country, smooth jazz, and urban all utilize the same basic principles, with the most popular songs repeating every two to six hours, depending on their rank in the rotation. Generally, there is a strict order or list to be followed, and the DJ does not make decisions about what selections are played.

AOR, while still based on the rotation concept, focused on the album as a whole rather than singles. In the early 1970s, many DJs had the freedom to choose which track(s) to play off a given album – as well as latitude to decide in what order to play the records. Consequently, AOR radio gave mainstream exposure to album tracks that never became hits on the record charts that were limited to singles; Billboard, for instance, did not establish an airplay chart for album tracks until 1981.

Later in the 1970s, AOR formats became tighter and song selection shifted to the program director or music director rather than the DJ. Still, when an AOR station added an album to rotation, they would often focus on numerous tracks at once, rather than playing the singles as they were individually released.

Criticism
In the early 1980s, AOR radio was criticized by the Black Music Association, a trade association, and other industry observers for the lack of Black artists included in their programming. AOR programmers responded that the lack of diversity was the result of increased specialization of radio formats driven by ratings and audience demographics. In 1983, the success of Michael Jackson's album Thriller led to the album's track "Beat It," which featured Eddie Van Halen, being added to the playlists of many AOR channels. At the same time, other Black artists also made inroads into AOR radio: Jackson ("Beat It"), Prince ("Little Red Corvette"), and Eddy Grant ("Electric Avenue") debuted on Billboard'''s Top Tracks chart during the same week in April 1983. Through the remainder of the 1980s, Jon Butcher, Tracy Chapman, Living Colour, Prince, and Lenny Kravitz also received AOR airplay.

Spin-off formats

In the 1980s, some AOR radio stations added glam metal bands such as Mötley Crüe and Bon Jovi, while others embraced modern rock acts such as the Fixx, INXS, and U2. But by the end of the decade, AOR stations were playing fewer and fewer new artists, and the rise of grunge, alternative rock, and hip-hop accelerated the fade-out of the album-oriented rock format. By the early 1990s, many AOR stations switched exclusively to the classic rock format or segued to other current formats with somewhat of an AOR approach:

 Rock 40 – A service-marked format developed by Joint Communications in 1987 and referred to as "Male CHR" (contemporary hits radio) by Burkhart, Douglas, & Associates, which had difficulty because it was too close to other AOR formats and did not appeal to CHR fans because of the lack of music other than rock. Lee Abrams said the format was "too wimpy for the real rockers and too hard for the mainstream people." Most of these stations were considered in the radio trade publications to be Top 40/CHR stations rather than AOR. For a time in the mid-to-late 1980s, Cleveland's WMMS considered themselves to be a Rock 40 station. From 1989 until 1991, WAAF in Worcester–Boston, Massachusetts, considered themselves to be a Rock 40 station. The most successful Rock 40 station, however, when it came to duration with the format was KEGL The Eagle in Dallas–Fort Worth, Texas, which was mostly a rock-leaning Top 40 station from 1981 until 1992.
 Active rock – The modern-day mainstream rock/AOR merge. Playing artists such as Stone Temple Pilots, Nickelback, Creed, Foo Fighters, Linkin Park, and Korn. The active rock format was pioneered by the now-defunct KNAC-FM of Long Beach–Los Angeles, California, in 1986. KNAC program director/DJ Tom Marshall and music director/DJ Michael Davis had previously worked at rock station KFMG in Albuquerque, New Mexico. Active rock was also pioneered by the nationally syndicated Z Rock network, which lasted from 1986 to 1996, and expanded upon by WXTB out of Clearwater, Florida, starting in 1990.
 Adult album alternative (known as Triple A or AAA) – Echoed a softer AOR without hard rock or heavy metal. For a time, Seattle's KMTT even promoted "Freeform Fridays" and the Grey Pony Tail Special to highlight the halcyon days of FM radio. WXRT in Chicago is a long-running AAA station. Other Triple A stations with strong and long heritage are KINK in Portland, Oregon; KSPN-FM in Aspen, Colorado; KFMU-FM in Oak Creek–Steamboat Springs, Colorado; WNCS The Point'' in Montpelier–Burlington, VT; WMWV in Conway, New Hampshire; WDST in Woodstock, New York; WRSI in Turners Falls–Northampton, Massachusetts; WXPN in Philadelphia, Pennsylvania; and KBCO in Denver–Boulder, Colorado.
 Modern rock or alternative rock – Pioneers in this format were KROQ-FM in Los Angeles, XETRA-FM (91X) in San Diego, KTCL in Denver (but was licensed to Fort Collins in the 1970s through 1990s), the late KCGL-FM, KJQN (now Bible Broadcasting Network O&O KYFO-FM) in Ogden–Salt Lake City, Utah; and WOXY (97X) in Mason–Cincinnati, Ohio (which today broadcasts a Spanish variety format as La Mega 97.7 while keeping the WOXY calls), all of which took the AOR programming approach to music with new wave, punk, college rock, and grunge/alternative leanings, mostly in the 1980s.
 Classic rock – Developed from the album-oriented rock (AOR) format in the early 1980s. The classic rock format features music ranging generally from the late 1960s to the mid-1990s, primarily focusing on commercially successful blues rock and hard rock popularized in the 1970s AOR format. The radio format became increasingly popular with the baby boomer demographic by the end of the 1990s.

See also 
 Album era

References

Rock music genres
Rock radio formats
Rock